Kim Nilsson (born March 28, 1988) is a Swedish floorball player. He currently plays for FBC Kalmarsund, a club in the Swedish Super League. He has also played for Grasshopper Club Zürich in NLA and AIK in SSL. He is a part of Sweden's national floorball team, and is the top goal scorer all time for Sweden.

In a poll conducted by the Swedish magazine Innebandymagazinet, reporters and national team coaches have voted Nilsson the world's best floorball player twice; in 2014 and 2020.

Achievements 

 World's Best Floorball Player in 2014 and 2020 by Innebandymagazinet
 World Championships
 World Championships titles: 2012, 2014
 World Championships MVP: 2012, 2014
 Champions League
 Champion: 2009
 Swedish Super League
 Forward of the Year: 2010–11, 2013–14
 Rookie of the Year: 2007–08
 Champion: 2009
 Swiss National League
 Champion: 2016
 Allsvenskan Sodra
 Forward of the Year: 2016-17

References 

Living people
1988 births
Swedish floorball players
Swedish expatriate sportspeople in Switzerland
21st-century Swedish people